The 2022 Mid-Eastern Athletic Conference baseball tournament was played from May 19 to May 21 at Marty L. Miller Field on the campus of Norfolk State University in Norfolk, Virginia.  It was a four-team double elimination tournament.  The winner, claimed the Mid-Eastern Athletic Conference's automatic bid to the 2022 NCAA Division I baseball tournament.

It proved to be the last-ever MEAC tournament, at least for the foreseeable future. After the 2022 season, the MEAC merged its baseball league into that of the Northeast Conference (NEC), with the four remaining MEAC baseball schools becoming NEC affiliates.

Format and seeding
The four teams were seeded one through four based on regular season records, with the top seed playing the fourth seed and the other two teams facing off in first-round matchups.  The winners advanced in the winners' bracket, while first-round losers played elimination games.

Bracket

References

Tournament
Mid-Eastern Athletic Conference Baseball Tournament
MEAC baseball tournament